Diplurus is a genus of prehistoric mawsoniid coelacanth fish which lived during the Triassic period.

References 

Mawsoniidae
Prehistoric lobe-finned fish genera
Triassic bony fish
Fossils of the United States